The Saigon River is a river located in southern Vietnam that rises near Phum Daung in southeastern Cambodia, flows south and south-southeast for about  and empties into the Soài Rạp, which in its turn empties into the South China Sea some  northeast of the Mekong Delta.

Saigon River is important to Ho Chi Minh City as it is the main water supply as well as the host of Saigon Port, with a total cargo volume loaded and outloaded of more than 35 million metric tons in 2006.

The Bình Quới Tourist Village is located on the Thanh Da peninsula on the Saigon River, in the Bình Thạnh District of Ho Chi Minh City.

Thủ Thiêm Tunnel, an underwater tunnel passing below the Saigon River, was opened to traffic on November 20, 2011. Since its completion, it has been the longest cross-river tunnel in Southeast Asia. The river is also crossed by the Thu Thiem Bridge, Thu Thiem 2 Bridge, and Phu My Bridge.

The Saigon Waterbus service launched in 2017, connecting District 1 with Thu Duc District.

See also
Bình Triệu Bridge

References

External links

 
Rivers of Đồng Nai province
Rivers of Ho Chi Minh City
Rivers of Cambodia
International rivers of Asia
Rivers of Vietnam